Josef Benetseder (born 10 February 1983 in Ried im Innkreis) is an Austrian former professional cyclist, who currently works as a directeur sportif for UCI Continental team .

Major results

2003
 3rd Road race, National Under-23 Road Championships
2004
 National Under-23 Road Championships
3rd Road race
3rd Time trial
2008
 3rd Raiffeisen Grand Prix
 8th Giro di Romagna
2010
 1st Stage 2 Oberösterreichrundfahrt
 2nd Croatia–Slovenia
2011
 3rd Time trial, National Road Championships
 9th Overall Oberösterreichrundfahrt
 9th Croatia–Slovenia
2012
 1st  National Hill Climb Championships
 2nd Road race, National Road Championships
 6th Grand Prix Südkärnten
2013
 1st Tour Bohemia
 5th Banja Luka–Belgrade II
 10th Overall Okolo Jižních Čech

References

External links

1983 births
Living people
Austrian male cyclists